Marylebone High Street is a shopping street in London, running sub-parallel to Baker Street and terminating at its northern end at the junction with Marylebone Road. Given its secluded location, the street has been described as "the hidden wonder of the West End" and it was voted "best street in London" in 2002 by listeners of BBC Radio 4, winning praise for its being "a haven in the middle of the frantic city".

Marylebone High Street was also a ward of the City of Westminster from 2002 to 2022. The population of this ward at the 2011 Census was 10,366.

History

Soon after the construction St Marylebone Parish Church on the north end of the street in approximately 1400, Marylebone High Street became the focus of the village of Marylebone, a role it has continued ever since.

1738 saw the official opening of Marylebone Gardens on the east side of the street, a stylish concert venue which attracted eminent composers such as George Frideric Handel and James Hook; the entrance to the Gardens was through the "Rose Tavern", a public house on 35-36 Marylebone High Street, which until September 2009 was the home of BBC London which has since moved to BBC Broadcasting House.

The majority of the buildings in the street today date from 1900, since which point the street has been consistently revitalised by the main local landlord, Howard de Walden Estates, which has been credited with turning a "once-shabby area of central London" into an elegant street which carefully manages its "mix of boutiques and small retailers". Property prices in the area have soared in recent years.

References

External links

Shopping streets in London
Streets in the City of Westminster
Howard de Walden Estate